Wambidgee is a 1962 Australian television series featuring Puppetoons. There were 12 episodes, each running 7 minutes.

The idea came from Bill Copland, who produced and directed. Denys Burrows wrote the scripts. Robert Knapp designed the puppetoons. John Antill did music.

Premise
The adventures of a young aboriginal boy living in the bush.

References

External links
 Wambidgee at IMDb
 Wambidgee at Australian Screen Online

1962 Australian television series debuts
Australian children's television series